Song Yushui (born February 1966) is a Chinese judge and politician who is the current vice chairwoman of the All-China Women's Federation.

She was a representative of the 17th, 18th, and 19th National Congress of the Chinese Communist Party. She was an alternate member of the 19th Central Committee of the Chinese Communist Party. She is a representative of the 20th National Congress of the Chinese Communist Party and an alternate member of the 20th Central Committee of the Chinese Communist Party. She was a delegate to the 11th National People's Congress.

Early life and education
Song was born in Penglai County (now Penglai District), Shandong, in February 1966. In 1985, she entered the Renmin University of China, where she majored in law. She also received a doctor's degree in law from the China University of Political Science and Law in June 2010.

Political career
Song joined the Chinese Communist Party (CCP) in October 1988.

After university in 1989, Song was assigned to the Beijing Haidian District People's Court, where she successively worked as clerk, judge, and deputy chief justice.

Song was appointed vice chairwoman of the All-China Women's Federation in October 2013, in addition to serving as deputy chief justice of the Beijing Intellectual Property Court since November 2014.

References

1966 births
Living people
People from Yantai
Renmin University of China alumni
China University of Political Science and Law alumni
People's Republic of China politicians from Shandong
Chinese Communist Party politicians from Shandong
Alternate members of the 19th Central Committee of the Chinese Communist Party
Alternate members of the 20th Central Committee of the Chinese Communist Party
Delegates to the 11th National People's Congress
Chinese judges